South Street Historic District can refer to:
 South Street Historic District (Greenville, Alabama)
 South Street Historic District (Brockton, Massachusetts)
 South Street Historic District (Gorham, Maine)
 South Street Historic District (Kalamazoo, Michigan)
 South Street Historic District (Cuba, New York)
 South Street Historic District (Pawtucket, Rhode Island)